Philippe Ulrich (born March 28, 1951) is a composer, producer, programmer, video game creator and entrepreneur.

In March 1999 he was made a knight of the French Ordre des Arts et des Lettres.

References

1951 births
Living people
Place of birth missing (living people)
French video game designers
French computer programmers
20th-century French composers
Chevaliers of the Ordre des Arts et des Lettres
French businesspeople